Roguy Méyé (born 7 October 1986) is a Gabonese former professional footballer who played as a striker. Between 2003 and 2012, he made 34 FIFA official international appearances scoring 6 goals for Gabon national team.

Club career
Méyé was born in Makokou, Gabon.

On 5 July 2007, Méyé signed a five-year contract with Hungarian first division outfit Zalaegerszegi TE, which won the Hungarian championship in 2002. He was transferred to Ankaraspor in the January 2009 transfer window. On 23 October 2009, he joined to Ankaragücü on a one-year loan.

The summer of 2011 found him in Zalaegerszeg again where he returned after a rather unsuccessful Turkish experience. In February 2012 he got a somewhat unexpected chance to fight for greater aims: he earned himself the attention of one of the Hungarian top clubs Debreceni VSC which snapped him up for an undisclosed fee. His new contract lasts for four years.

On 1 May 2012, Méyé won the 2011–12 Magyar Kupa with Debrecen by beating MTK Budapest on penalty shoot-out. This was the fifth Hungarian Cup trophy for Debrecen.

On 12 May 2012, Méyé won the Hungarian League title with Debrecen after beating Pécs in the 28th round of the Hungarian League by 4–0 at the Oláh Gábor út Stadium which resulted the sixth Hungarian League title for the Hajdús.

International career
Méyé scored his first goal for the Gabon national team in a 2–1 victory over Morocco. Between 2003 and 2012, he made 34 FIFA official appearances scoring six goals.

Career statistics

International goals
Scores and results list Gabon's goal tally first, score column indicates score after each Méyé goal.

Honours
Debrecen
 Hungarian League: 2012
 Hungarian Cup: 2012

References

External links
 

1986 births
Living people
Gabonese footballers
Association football forwards
Gabon international footballers
2010 Africa Cup of Nations players
2012 Africa Cup of Nations players
Gabonese expatriate footballers
Paris FC players
AS Mangasport players
Zalaegerszegi TE players
Ankaraspor footballers
MKE Ankaragücü footballers
Debreceni VSC players
Süper Lig players
Nemzeti Bajnokság I players
Expatriate footballers in Hungary
Expatriate footballers in Turkey
Expatriate footballers in France
Gabonese expatriate sportspeople in Hungary
Gabonese expatriate sportspeople in Turkey
Gabonese expatriate sportspeople in France
21st-century Gabonese people